Karanja or Uran Island is a town in Raigad district of Maharashtra, India, about  long and  broad. It lies in the south-east of Mumbai Harbour, about  miles south-east of the Carnac pier in Mumbai.

References
Karanja from Raigad 

Cities and towns in Raigad district